David Ian Campese, AM (born 21 October 1962), also known as Campo, is a former Australian rugby union player (1982-1996), who was capped by the Wallabies 101 times, and played 85 Tests at wing and 16 at fullback. He retired in 1996 and was awarded the Order of Australia in 2002 for his contribution to Australian rugby. David is a now well respected media commentator working in broadcasting and print media for over 30 years. He travels the world as an International guest speaker, delivering his life story which focuses on risk taking, team work and self belief, all of which were instrumental in his dramatic rise to stardom against all odds as an outsider from a small country town. He also works as an Ambassador to businesses, offering value through his internationally recognised brand and influential business network. He has worked with Coca-Cola Amatil, DHL, Adidas, Ladbrokes, and Investec. David’s website is www.davidcampese.com

Career Summary 
Campese debuted for the Wallabies on the 1982 Australia rugby union tour of New Zealand, during which he scored one try in each of his first two Tests. In 1983, he equalled the then Australian record for most tries in a Test, scoring four for Australia against the USA. He toured with the Eighth Wallabies for the 1984 Australia rugby union tour of Britain and Ireland that won rugby union's "grand slam", the first Australian side to defeat all four home nations, England, Ireland, Wales and Scotland, on a tour. He was a member of the Wallabies on the 1986 Australia rugby union tour of New Zealand that beat the All Blacks 2–1, one of six international teams and second Australian team to win a test series in New Zealand. He participated in the inaugural 1987 Rugby World Cup, during which he broke the then world record for most tries scored by an international rugby player in the semi-final against France. Campese was a member of the Wallabies that won the 1991 Rugby World Cup, during which he was the tournament's equal leading try-scorer with six, and acclaimed "Player of the Tournament".

Campese won his second Bledisloe Cup in 1992 when the Wallabies defeated the All Blacks 2–1. During the 1992 Australia rugby union tour of South Africa, he scored his 50th career Test try against South Africa in Cape Town. He won his third Bledisloe Cup in 1994, playing for an Australian team that defeated New Zealand in a one-off Test. On the 1996 Australia rugby union tour of Europe, Campese became the first Australian rugby union player, and second international player, to reach the milestone of playing 100 Tests. He retired from international rugby at the end of tour, having played 101 tests and scored a then world-record 64 test tries. This record has since been overtaken by Daisuke Ohata (on 14 May 2006) and Bryan Habana.

At state level, Campese represented both the Australian Capital Territory and New South Wales. In 1983, he scored two tries, four conversions, and a penalty goal, in an Australian Capital Territory victory over Argentina. In 1991, he scored five tries for New South Wales in a 71–8 victory over Wales. At club level, Campese played for the Queanbeyan Whites from 1979 until 1986, and Randwick from 1987 to 1999. He won three consecutive grand finals with the Queanbeyan Whites from 1981 to 1983, and in the 1983 grand final he scored all of his team's points in a 29–12 victory, scoring four tries, two conversions and three penalty goals. He won eight grand finals with Randwick, including six consecutive victories from 1987 to 1992, as well as triumphs in 1994 and 1996.

Campese also played rugby union in Italy for nine years (1984/85-1992/93) during which he won the Top12 on five occasions with two teams. He played for Petrarca Padova from 1984/85 until 1987/88 and won the Italian Championship in his first three years with the club (1984/85-1986/87). In 1988, Campese transferred to Amatori where he won the Italian championship for the 1990/91 and 1992/93 seasons. He was awarded Player of the Year for his 1991/2 season.

Campese was also a renowned rugby sevens player. He made 12 appearances at the Hong Kong Sevens (1983–1990, 1993–94, 1997–98),
 during which he played in three victorious Australian campaigns (1983, 1985 and 1988), and was awarded the Leslie Williams Award for Player of the Tournament in 1988. In 1987, Campese won the New South Wales Sevens tournament, held at Concord Oval, playing for an Australian side that defeated New Zealand 22–12 in the final. In 1990, he participated in the 100th Melrose Sevens tournament playing for the victorious Randwick rugby club, during which he scored 44 of Randwick's 92 points. He participated in the inaugural Rugby World Cup Sevens tournament in 1993, held at Murrayfield in Edinburgh, Scotland, in which his Australian team lost to England 17–21 in the final. In 1998, he captained Australia to its first rugby sevens tournament victory in ten years at the Paris Sevens. He captained the Australian rugby sevens team at the 1998 Commonwealth Games to a bronze medal. In 2015, the Hong Kong Rugby Football Union (HKRFU) announced Campese as one of seven members of 'The Hong Kong Magnificent Sevens', the HKRFU's commemorative campaign to recognise the seven most formative players to have played in the past 40 Years of Sevens in Hong Kong.

He is famous for his "goose-step" — a hitch-kick motion which left opponents stumbling to try to tackle him.

Early life and rugby career
David Campese was born on 21 October 1962, in Queanbeyan, New South Wales to Gianantonio and Joan Campese. His older brother Mario was born in 1959. Campese has two sisters, Lisa and Corrina. Lisa was born in 1964 and Corrina was born in 1965. In 1966 his family moved back to Montecchio Precalcino in northern Italy for eighteen months before moving back to Australia and settling in Queanbeyan, New South Wales.

Campese attended his local public school and high school and played rugby league from the ages of eight to sixteen for the Queanbeyan Blues. At age 16 he gave up all forms of rugby to play golf. In 1978 he won the ACT-Monaro Schoolboys golf title.

David Campese played his first game of rugby union for the Queanbeyan Whites in 1979 in fourth grade. During 1980 he was promoted to first grade. After two years of first-grade rugby, in 1981 Campese was promoted to the Australian under-21 squad to tour New Zealand that was beaten 37–7. Shortly after, Campese was selected in a 'trial match' prior to the 1981–82 Australia rugby union tour of Britain and Ireland, but did not achieve national selection.

International Test Career

1982 Bledisloe Cup Test Series
On the night of Australia's second Test against Scotland in 1982, ten Australian rugby players announced that for personal and business reasons they would not be available for the 1982 Australian tour to New Zealand, including the Wallabies' premier winger Brendan Moon. Following this announcement, David Campese was selected for the 1982 Australia rugby union tour of New Zealand.

Following the Wallabies first tour match against Taranaki in New Plymouth, David Campese debuted for the Wallabies in a match against Manawatu in Palmerston North, in which he scored a solo try and kicked three goals from five attempts in a 26–10 victory. He played in the following game against Hawke's Bay at Napier and, two matches later, was chosen for his first Test.

Australia 18 – New Zealand 33 (Auckland – 11 September 1982)
Campese played a central part in one of the biggest talking points of the third and final Test.

The Wallabies set a scoring record for an Australian rugby union tour of New Zealand by scoring 316 points in 14 matches, including 47 tries. This surpassed the achievement of the 1972 Australian team, which scored 229 in 13 matches. Australian sportswriter Jack Pollard documented that Campese "scored eight tries in nine games, kicked four goals and two penalties for a total of 48 points."

This included a try and three successful goals kicked from five attempts in his debut match against Manawatu, two tries and a conversion (10 points) in the Wallabies's 11th tour game against Bay of Plenty (lost 16–40), and 13 points against North Auckland at Whangarei in the Wallabies final game prior to the third Test of the series (won 16–12), in which Campese scored two tries, a penalty and a conversion, before being named 'man of the match'. Campese was also deprived of a try in the Wallabies' 12th match on tour against Counties when Counties' player Alan Dawson, shoved Campese in the back and away from the ball before he could touch it down. A photograph of Dawson's shove is published in Bob Dwyer's autobiography The Winning Way, in which Dwyer asserts that Dawson "cost Campo the try and the Wallabies the match".

1983

Campese played seven Tests for Australia in 1983.

Australia 49 – United States 3 (Sydney – 9 July 1983)

1983: Australia vs Argentina
In 1983, Campese played three matches against the touring Argentina national rugby union team, including two Test matches. On 20 July 1983 Campese played at fullback for the ACT, scoring two tries, four conversions, and a penalty goal, in a 35–9 victory over the touring Argentinian side. The match was Argentina's second match on tour and the only loss they suffered in a provincial game on tour.

1983 Bledisloe Cup Test (Sydney)
Campese played in the Wallabies' sole Bledisloe Cup Test of 1983 against the All Blacks, which was lost 18–8. Campese continued to substitute at full-back for the injured Roger Gould. Again, Australian coach Bob Dwyer recommended Randwick player Glen Ella for the full-back position in Gould's absence, but was overruled by his co-selectors.

1983 Tour to Italy and France

In 1983 the Australia national rugby union team traveled to Europe for the 1983 Australia rugby union tour of Italy and France.

Australia played seven provincial games on the tour, lost two of them, drew one, and won four.

Australia 29 – Italy 7 (Rovigo – 22 October 1983)

Incumbent Australian fullback Roger Gould aggravated a thigh injury prior to the Test against Italy. However, Campese was selected on the wing, and Randwick fullback Glen Ella was selected in his second Test for Australia at fullback. Campese was assigned the goal-kicking duties against Italy.

Australia 15 – France 15 (Clermont-Ferrard – 13 November 1983)
Campese played in Australia's first Test against France, a game drawn 15–15 at Clermont-Ferrand.

Australian fullback Roger Gould returned to the Australian team for the Test against . However, due to an injury Gould sustained, Campese continued to perform the goal-kicking responsibilities for the Wallabies, following his goal-kicking performance against Italy. Campese played a diminished role in the Test as Australia elected a less expansive style of play.

Campese kicked one conversion in the first Test against France.

Australia 6 – France 15 (Paris – 19 November 1983)
Campese returned to the Australian team in the goal-kicker role, while playing winger, for its second Test against France at Parc des Princes, lost 6-15. He kicked one penalty goal in the game.

1984 Bledisloe Cup Test Series

Australia 16 – Fiji 3 (Suva – 9 June 1984)
Prior to the 1984 Bledisloe Cup Test Series, Australia played a Test against Fiji in Suva on 9 June 1984, in which Campese scored one try.

1st Test: Australia 16 – New Zealand 9 (Sydney – 21 July 1984)
David Campese was selected, along with Mark Ella, to share the goal-kicking responsibility for the first Test against New Zealand in 1984.

2nd Test: Australia 15 – New Zealand 19 (Brisbane – 4 August 1984)
During the second Bledisloe Cup Test of 1984, Australia led New Zealand 12–0. However, All Black fullback Robbie Deans then kicked five penalty goals in a row to give New Zealand a 15–12 lead. Campese was involved in the fifth penalty of the match. Campese was assigned goal-kicking duties in this Test, and kicked a penalty to bring the score to 15-all with eight minutes left in the Test. However, the All Blacks scored a try in the final stages of the match to win 19–15.

1984 Grand Slam

Campese was a member of the Eighth Wallabies for the 1984 Australia rugby union tour of Britain and Ireland that won rugby's "grand slam", the first Australian side to defeat all four home sides, England, Ireland, Wales and Scotland, on a tour. He played in 10 of the 18 tour matches, including all four Tests against the Home Nations and the final match against the Barbarians. He scored six tries on tour, more than any other Australian player - two of them in the final Test match against Scotland.

Campese played on the right wing in Australia's first tour match against London Division, won 22–3. He was switched to fullback for the Wallabies' second tour match against South and South West Division, drawn 12-12, and then rested for the third match of the tour against Cardiff (lost 12-16) with James Black selected at fullback and Ross Hanley on the wing. He returned to the side for Australia's fourth match on tour against Combined Services, in which he scored three tries and made the final pass for two more tries, scored by Bill Campbell and Andrew Slack, in an eight-try 44–9 victory. Campese was then rested for the Wallabies fifth match on tour, and their final match before the first Test against England, won 17–7 against Swansea (after the match was abandoned due to floodlight failure).

Following Australia's first Test victory against England (their sixth match on tour), Campese was rested for the seventh match on tour against Midlands Division. Australia were scheduled to play Ireland the weekend following their Test against England, and Wallabies coach Alan Jones opted to select a second-string side that defeated Midlands Division 21–18.

Following Australia's second Test victory on tour against Ireland (won 16-9), Campese came-on as a late replacement in Australia's 9–16 loss to Ulster. Replacing James Black, Campese "set up another try with his first touch." Terry Cooper reports that, "He sliced through the defence, Hawker and Lynagh moved the ball on briskly and Grigg scored easily." However, Ulster's winning penalty was kicked following a penalty awarded against Campese. Campese was rested for the next two tour matches against Munster (won 31-19) and Llanelli (lost 16-19), prior to the Wallabies' third tour Test against Wales, won 28–9. Some time between Australia's second Test victory over Ireland and its third Test over Wales, Campese fell ill with the flu.

Following the third Test of the tour against Wales, Campese scored a try in the final minutes of Australia's 19–12 victory over Northern Division - his fourth try on tour. The match against Northern Division was Campese's last provincial match on tour. Australia lost to South of Scotland 6-9 and defeating Glasgow 26-12 prior to its final Test against Scotland, won 35–12. Australia then defeated Pontpool 21–18 in their final provincial match prior to the tour-closing match against the Barbarians. The match against the Barbarians featured what Campese regards as one of his four greatest performances playing for the Wallabies.

Australia 19 – England 3 (London – 3 November 1984)
The Wallabies had a nervy start in the game against , the first international test of the Grand Slam tour. Campese almost scored early on by chasing a high kick from Michael Lynagh. Australia settled later on after tries from Ella and Lynagh, before Campese was to make a break down the left leading to a try.

With 14 minutes left in the Test, Australia's left wing Brendan Moon suffered a broken arm in a tackle. Australian winger Matt Burke replaced Moon, moving to the right wing, and shifting Campese to play on the left wing.

In For Love Not Money Australian flanker Simon Poidevin recalls that, "For the last of our three tries I was tailing Campese down the touchline like a faithful sheepdog when he tossed me an overhead pass and over I went to score the Twickenham try every kid dreams of."

Australia 28 – Wales 9 (Cardiff – 24 November 1984)
As Australian number 8 Steve Tuynman took the ball from the back of the scrum, he searched for Nick Farr-Jones, utilising the blind under Alan Jones' command. Farr-Jones occupied Campese opposite winger and passed the ball to him, allowing Campese to run along the left wing. At the start of his run, Campese ran past Butler, who was unable to make the defending tackle. But Campese's run was not over yet, he swerved past the Welsh fullback, and executed a wonderful sidestep to get past the Welsh inside center. Campese's sidestep led him toward a group of defenders, so he then offloaded to Simon Poidevin, who quickly passed the ball to Michael Lynagh who scored an easy try under the post. Australia won 28–9.

Australia 37 – Scotland 12 (Murrayfield – 8 December 1984)
Campese scored two tries in the Test against Scotland – the first tries Campese scored at Test level on the 1984 Tour to the United Kingdom.

Australia 37 – Barbarians 30 (Cardiff – 18 December 1984)
Australia played against the Barbarians one week after winning the Grand Slam. That match is perhaps best remembered for David Campese's zig-zagging run that turned Welsh centre Robert Ackerman inside out in the process, before Campese, opting not to run past Ackerman in the process of confounding him, but rather offered himself to be tackled before passing the ball to Michael Hawker for a try. Campese received praise for other moments in this game.

1985
Australia commenced their 1985 Test season with a two-Test series against Canada, in which Campese did not play due to injury." Campese also did not play in the single Bledisloe Cup Test in 1985, lost 9-10 to New Zealand. In Path to Victory former Australian rugby player Mark Ella wrote that, "Without David Campese, our backs seemed to have forgotten how to score tries."

Australia v Fiji (1985)
Campese returned to the Australian Test side later in 1985 for a two-Test series against Fiji. Australia won the first Test 52-28 and the second Test 31–9.

1986

Australia 39 – Italy 18 (Brisbane – 1 June 1986)
Campese scored two tries against Italy in Australia's first Test of the 1986 season, with what rugby writer Terry Smith in Path to Victory described as "probably his most complete display in Australia's colours." By scoring his 14th Test try, Campese equalled Australian winger Brendan Moon's record for most Test tries scored by an Australian player. By scoring his 15th Test try, Campese broke this record. He also became the third Australian to score 100 career Test match points.

Australia 27 – France 14 (Sydney – 21 June 1986)
Australia's won their second Test of 1986 against Five Nations champions France, 27–14. Campese was moved to fullback for the injured Roger Gould in a one-off game against France, scoring a try in the 26th minute."

Australia v Argentina (1986)
Campese continued to play at fullback in Australia's 1986 two-Test home series against Argentina, substituting for the injured Australian fullback Roger Gould.

Following several performances from Campese that garnered critical acclaim, Australian coach Alan Jones proclaimed David Campese to be "the Bradman of rugby". Jones said that Campese had a special talent that nobody else in rugby was as talented as him. Jones' proclamation was well documented by the Australia media and had a detrimental effect on Campese. As the weight of expectation grew, so too did the criticisms for any mistake Campese made.

1986 Bledisloe Cup Test Series
Campese was a member of the 1986 Australia Wallabies that defeated the New Zealand All Blacks in New Zealand. The 1986 Australia Wallabies became the second Australian rugby team to beat the New Zealand All Blacks in New Zealand in a rugby union Test series. They are one of six rugby union teams to win a rugby Test series in New Zealand, along with the 1937 South African Springboks, the 1949 Australian Wallabies, the 1971 British Lions, the 1994 French touring side, and the 2009 French touring team (who tied their series with the All Blacks 1–1 on Tests, but claimed the series as a whole on a greater aggregate of points, thus claiming the series trophy).

Campese played fullback in the first two Tests of the 1986 Test series versus New Zealand, before being moved to wing in the final Test.

1st Test: Australia 13 – New Zealand 12 (Wellington – 9 August 1986)
Three moments involving David Campese are frequently recorded in reports of the first Test against New Zealand in 1986. Rugby journalist Terry Smith records in Path to Victory that:

In spite of having the wind advantage, it took twenty-two minutes for Australia to break the spirited All Black defensive line with a try by fullback David Campese, his twentieth in twenty-five Tests. From a scrum win, Nick Farr-Jones made a glorious break on the open side, stumbled, and when tackled, Campese was there with razor-sharp reactions to toe the ball over the line and dive on it for a try that gave Lynagh a simple conversion."

Jenkins documents Campese's involvement in Australia's second try in Wallaby Gold by writing that, "From Farr-Jones, the ball spun to Brett Papworth, then to Campese, who held up the pass until winger John Kirwan was lured infield from Burke. Campese then tossed the ball to Burke, who pulled it in to have a clear run to the corner."

Peter Jenkins records that, "Campese, having scored one try and created another, had a significant role in the third, this time for the All Blacks. His infield pass when tackled near halfway finished in the arms of All Black centre Joe Stanley. He swept downfield and, when taken by Lynagh, slipped a pass to flanker Mark Brooke-Cowden for the try."

2nd Test: Australia 12 – New Zealand 13 (Dunedin – 23 August 1986)

Australia lost the second Bledisloe Cup Test of 1986 to New Zealand 12–13. Following the Test, claims were made that Australian coach Alan Jones made derogatory remarks about Campese's performance, after the fullback dropped a few 'high-kicks' in very wet conditions.

In On A Wing and a Prayer Campese asserted that later that day during the night-time he visited Jones in his hotel room and tried to apologise for his mistakes, which resulted in a verbal barrage of insults from Jones which lasted many minutes. Jones is reported to have told Campese that, "I told the papers you were the Bradman of rugby - now you've let me down." Nick Farr-Jones is reported to have overheard the conversation between Campese and Alan Jones, before he entered the room and attempted to calm the situation.

In On a Wing and a Prayer Campese recalled that: "I left that room feeling hurt and humiliated. I did something I virtually never do, as I said much earlier: I went out and got drunk. Outside in the Dunedin night the rain was trickling down the windows and the wind was blowing. It was cold and horrible, which exactly reflected my mood. The drops of rain on the windows could have been tears in my soul."

In David Campese (1996) Gordon Bray wrote that: "So distraught was he in a nightclub a few hours later, that he declared he was ready to retire from rugby. It was distressing to see such a gifted athlete and entertainer so despondent and agitated. The world's rugby enthusiasts can be grateful that Mark Ella consoled his teammate that night."

Years later in Wallaby Gold: The History of Australian Test Rugby (2003) Alan Jones contested the accusations of slander saying:

3rd Test: Australia 22 – New Zealand 9 (Auckland – 6 September 1986)
In Path to Victory: Wallaby Power in the 1980s the Daily Mirror's Terry Smith writes that, "One very famous player was in danger of losing his Test spot in New Zealand until his team-mates urged Jones to retain him." Australian coach Alan Jones selected Campese on the wing for the final test instead of fullback. This Test marked the first time David Campese opposed All Black winger John Kirwan. Kirwan had missed the 1984 Bledisloe series due to injury. Campese had missed the 1985 Bledisloe Cup Test due to injury.

1987 Rugby World Cup
In On a Wing and a Prayer Campese wrote that, "the first-ever World Cup, in 1987, was ultimately a disaster both for Australia and for me personally." Campese played throughout the entire 1987 World Cup impeded by injury.

Campese missed a pre-World Cup Test match against South Korea in Brisbane on 17 May 1987 due to injury. However, he made a successful return to the Wallabies for their first World Cup pool match against England.

World Cup Pool Match: Australia 19 – England 6 (Sydney – 23 May 1987)
Campese was involved in the biggest controversy of his first World Cup game against England. Rugby writer Peter Jenkins in Wallaby Gold records that, "It took 10 minutes into the second half for Australia to score their first try, a controversial one, when Campese went across. He placed the ball on the knee of English rival Rory Underwood before it bounced away and Lynagh grounded it over the English line. But referee Keith Lawrence had already awarded the try to Campese...

Campese later confessed that, "The chief talking-point was the fact that I was awarded a try which I never touched down properly. It was not a score. It you study the video, it is obvious that I was not happy with the decision the referee made..."

Campese's defence in this Test was later criticised by Australian coach Alan Jones.

World Cup Pool Match: Australia 47 – USA 21 (Brisbane – 31 May 1987)
In Wallaby Gold: The History of Australian Test Rugby rugby writer Peter Jenkins documents that, "...individually, there had been some impressive moments. Winger Campese, criticised the week before by Jones for indifferent defence, received after this game a one-word endorsement from the coach: 'Fantastic.' Campese scored a try, his 23rd, just one short of the world record, and produced an inspired flick pass for halfback Brian Smith to cross.

World Cup Pool Match: Australia 42 – Japan 23 (Sydney – 3 June 1987)
Playing at fullback, Campese scored his 24th Test try in Australia's World Cup pool match against Japan, equaling the then world record for tries with Ian Smith of Scotland (1924–33).

World Cup Quarter-Final: Australia 33 – Ireland 15 (Sydney- 7 June 1987)

World Cup Semi-Final: Australia 24 – France 30 (Sydney – 13 June 1987)
Campese has called the 1987 World Cup semi-final, played between Australia and France, the most memorable Test he ever played for Australia. In On a Wing and a Prayer he described it as "a great game of rugby, one of the very best in which I have ever played. Sensational things, like brilliant scores, started to happen in that game and we just carried on from there."

Campese scored his world record 25th Test try six minutes into the second half of the semi-final, surpassing Scotland winger Ian Smith's 54-year-old record for most international Test tries. In Blindsided Michael Lynagh documented how Campese scored his world-record try. "My dummy to wrong-foot Franck Mesnel and a step inside Philippe Sella [Note: It was Pierre Berbizier] set up a break deep inside French territory," Lynagh wrote. "As he usually did, Campo showed up at the end of the move to score in the corner after Peter Grigg popped the ball inside to him."

Campese later wrote that, "I was blamed for letting a kick from the French left wing, Patrice Lagisquet, bounce late in our semi-final against France at the Concord Oval, and the French picked up the loose ball to go on and score after a bewildering movement involving 11 passes. However, he later explained that, "The reason I did not catch Lagisquet's kick ahead near the end, when the scores were level at 24-24, was that I slipped in the mud trying to reach it."

In Campo: Still Entertaining, Campese offered the following reflection of the 1987 Rugby World Cup semi-final. "In 1987, there were just 18,000 people to watch us lose, at the death," he recalled, "a Test match still hailed as one of the greatest ever played."

World Cup Play-Off For Third: Australia 21- Wales 22 (Rotorua – 18 June 1987)

1987 Bledisloe Cup Test (Sydney)
Campese continued his injury-impeded 1987 season by playing in the one-off Bledisloe Cup Test of 1987, a month after the 1987 Rugby World Cup. Campese played on the right wing, and did not oppose his archrival John Kirwan in this Test.

In My Game Your Game Campese writes that, "It was not a memorable month or two, and later in the year I had to drop out of a major Wallaby tour for the one and only time in my career, when an x-ray of my ankle before we went to Argentina revealed the bone had cracked in half."

1988: Australia vs England
Campese returned to Test level rugby following his ankle injury in 1988 for the two-Test series against England.

Australia 22 - England 16 (Brisbane - 29 May 1988)
Brian Moore in Beware of the Dog: Rugby's Hard Man Reveals All that:

We were beaten in both Tests and the only memorable incident was one that the player involved is not keen to have brought back into the public arena. The Yorkshire winger, John Bentley, played rugby league professionally and starred on the British Lions tour of South Africa in 1997. He is known as a rough lad. However, when he squared up to David Campese, in the first Test in 1998 at Ballymore, Brisbane, he came off second best, with Campese leaving him with a bloodied nose.

1988 Bledisloe Cup Test Series
Australia were easily beaten in the 1988 Bledisloe Cup. Campese marked All Black winger John Kirwan for all three Tests in the series. Kirwan scored four tries in the series. Campese later confessed that Kirwan's excellent performances against him affected his confidence, such that his mother sent him a poem titled Winners Take Chances. For the rest of his career, Campese would read that poem before every Test he played in.

In the tribute book David Campese, Campese wrote of Kirwan that, "John Kirwan was another winger I really admired. He was a strong aggressive player, and he got the better of me quite a few times. With the ball in his hands JK was very determined. He had a job to do and it did not matter who was in front of him." Kirwan is recorded saying of Campese that, "It was difficult and daunting to play him because he had all the tricks. I tried to intimidate him as much as I could by getting close to him before I'd step and using my physicality against him."

Australia 7 - New Zealand 32 (Sydney - 2 July 1988)
In the first Test of the 1988 Bledisloe Cup New Zealand scored three tries in the opening 12 minutes of the match. In the opening minutes of the game, Australian fullback Andrew Leeds failed to catch a high kick, the ball fell to All Black prop Steve McDowell, who ran past Campese to score a try. John Kirwan scored his first try of the Test in the eighth minute by running past Campese, after All Black flyhalf Grant Fox called a double cut-out pass. Kirwan scored a second time in the 12th minute after an overlap had been created for him.

New Zealand led Australia 14–4 at halftime. Michael Lynagh kicked Australia's last points shortly after halftime to make the score 14–7, before the All Blacks rushed ahead to win the Test 32–7.

The loss was the then heaviest defeat the All Blacks had achieved against the Wallabies since the third Test of 1972 in Auckland, won by New Zealand 38–3.

Australia 19 - New Zealand 19 (Brisbane - 16 July 1988)
Following the Wallabies first Test defeat, the Australian team management planned to move Campese to the fullback position for the second Test, replacing Andrew Leeds. However, Australian flyhalf Michael Lynagh injured himself with a badly corked thigh in the second half of Queensland's 12–27 loss to the All Blacks, leaving Australia without a recognised goal-kicker. Randwick player Lloyd Walker was then selected at flyhalf, Leeds was reinstated at fullback so Australia could have a goal-kicker to replace Lynagh, and Campese moved back to the left-wing position.

Australia rushed to a 16-6 half-time lead. However, a try to John Kirwan, his third Test try in the series, brought New Zealand back into the Test.

The final score of 19-19 was the only time the All Blacks did not win a game of rugby from 1987 until late 1990.

Australia 9 - New Zealand 30
Australia lost the third and final 1988 Bledisloe Cup Test convincingly, 9-30. Late in the Test, Campese was moved to fullback to replace the injured Andrew Leeds. It was then that John Kirwan scored his fourth Test try of the series after a break from All Black openside flanker Michael Jones.

1988 Australian tour of England, Scotland and Italy
Campese recovered from his disappointing 1988 Bledisloe Cup Series to enjoy one of his finest ever tours on the 1988 Australia rugby union tour of England, Scotland and Italy, as a member of the Ninth Wallabies to tour the United Kingdom. Campese scored 15 tries on tour and achieved a personal total of 72 points.

The form of the Australian team suffered in the early stages of the tour, with Australia losing three of its first six provincial matches, before losing the first Test on tour to England. Following the Test loss to England, Australia went undefeated for the remainder of the tour.

While Australia struggled in the early stages of the tour, Campese's form was lauded by British critics. Campese played in Australia's first match on tour, lost 10–21 against London. In the second game on tour against Northern Division, lost 9-15, Campese scored a try in the early stages on the game. Campese scored three tries in a 37–9 victory over England B - Australia's third match on tour.

Campese, along with Wallaby captain Nick Farr-Jones, was then rested and selected on the bench for Australia's fourth match on tour, a 10–16 loss to South-West Division. Bolstered by the return of Michael Lynagh to the Australia national rugby union team, Campese regained selection for Australia's fifth provincial game against Midlands Division, in which he was instrumental in setting-up Brad Girvan for a try in the 60th minute. In the sixth match on tour against England Students, Campese scored two tries, kicked three conversions and two penalties, scoring 20 points in a 36–13 victory.

Campese played in Australia's ninth match on tour against South of Scotland. The Sydney Morning Herald rugby writer Greg Growden reported that, "Australia fully deserved to be 23-0 ahead at halftime after well-crafted tries by Niuqila, Gourley and David Campese, who left the field in the 30th minute with a slight groin strain." Campese was then rested for the 10th match on tour against North and Midlands of Scotland with Australian team management electing a side composed almost entirely of players who didn't play in Australia's victory over South of Scotland.

Following Australia's 32–13 victory over Scotland, Campese was rested for the Wallabies 12th game on tour against the Combined Services.

Australia 19 – England 28 (London – 5 November 1988)
Campese played Australia's first Test of the tour, a 19-28 loss to England at Twickenham. In the fourth minute of the second half, Campese scored a try (his seventh on tour), and Australia's second try of the game when he intercepted a Jonathan Webb pass to sprint 70 metres for a try, to give Australia a 13-9 lead. Jenkins writes that, "Australia scored three tries to England's four – including a 70-metre intercept effort from Campese..."

Australia 32 – Scotland 13 (Edinburgh – 19 November 1988)
Campese scored two tries in a 32–13 victory over the Scottish rugby team, in which Australia scored five tries to Scotland's two. Former Wallaby captain Andrew Slack, author of Noddy: The Official Biography of Michael Lynagh, wrote that, "Australia won 32-13 and although Lynagh was successful with only five kicks from eleven attempts, two delicate chip kicks provided tries for David Campese and ensured the restoration of Australia's rugby reputation." Slack further wrote that, "Campese had been the undoubted star of the tour, and that was made clear by the four youngsters who ran up and down the Murrayfield pitch after the game waving a large banner reading 'David Campese Walks on Water.'

Australia 40 – 22 Barbarians (Cardiff – 26 November 1988

Campese scored his first try in the match during the 5th minute of the second half. The Wallabies executed a backline movement where inside centre Lloyd Walker ran diagonally to his right and outside centre Michael Cook ran diagonally to his left. This opened space between the two centres. Michael Lynagh dummied a pass to Walker and indicated that he might pass the ball instead to Cook. Campese burst between the two centres, took a short pass from Lynagh, and scored his first try at Cardiff Arms Park under the posts.

In the 15th minute of the second half of the game, Campese received a cut-out pass on the left-wing while temporarily unmarked. He then produced a run where he beat about seven Barbarians players, that brought play to the Barbarian 22-metre line. After offloading the ball and keeping the play of the game going, Campese got to his feet and re-positioned himself in the first receiver position. After taking a pass from Nick Farr-Jones, he threw a long pass, cutting out his centres, to right-wing Acura Niuquila. Barbarian winger Rory Underwood made a cover defending tackle-attempt, and while Niuquila managed to shrug the tackle, the tackle slightly dislodged to ball, prompting Niuquila to "knock on the ball" just as he was about one metre from scoring a try.

Campese scored the second of his two tries with the final play of the game, prompting the crowd at Cardiff Arms Park to give him a standing ovation. He has described this try and his best try in international rugby.

Australia 55 – Italy 6 (Rome – 3 December 1988)
Campese concluded the 1988 Australia rugby union tour of England, Scotland and Italy with three tries against Italy in Rome.

1989: Australia vs British Lions
The British Lions toured Australia for a three-Test series in 1989, which Australia lost 1-2. The series is perhaps best known for "Campo's Corner" - a mistake Campese made in the third and deciding Test in the series.

2nd Test: Australia 12 – British Lions 19 (Brisbane – 8 July 1989)
In On a Wing and a Prayer Campese documents that, "...the second Test was a disaster for us. We still led the Lions 12-9 with under five minutes remaining, but we had been badly put off our game. The Lions had done that, plainly and simply, by intimidating us."

3rd Test: Australia 18 - British Lions 19 (Sydney – 15 July 1989)
In the first half of the series-deciding Test Campese recovered the rugby ball in-goal and successfully 'dummied' past Lions' winger Ieuan Evans, ran the ball beyond Australia's 22, and obtained a large territorial gain for Australia.

Campese's error made the scoreline 12–13, following Gavin Hastings missed conversion, costing Australia four points. The Lions forwards took over the Test, and surged ahead to a 19–12 lead. Following Campese's famous mistake, the Wallabies had an attacking opportunity from set-piece play, and Michael Lynagh called a move that, if executed properly, would have led to Campese scoring under the posts.

1989 Bledisloe Cup Test (Auckland)
Campese played in the one-off Bledisloe Cup Test in 1989 between Australia and New Zealand. The Test, which Australia lost 12–24. In the 15th minute of the first half of the Test, All Blacks flyhalf Grant Fox kicked the ball downfield on his non-preferred left foot. Australian right winger Ian Williams fielded the ball while running backwards and counterattacked toward the centre of the ground. New Zealand prop Richard Loe caught Williams with a high tackle and a ruck was formed. From the ruck, Nick Farr-Jones moved the ball to the left-side of the Wallabies' attack by passing the ball to Steve Tuynman. Tuynman moved the ball along to Campese on the wing, who stepped around John Kirwan causing him to slip over. Campese then passed to Farr-Jones who had looped both him and Tuynman. As Farr-Jones and Campese were running down the sideline, and with Farr-Jones about to be tackled into touch, Campese pointed forwards, signalling Farr-Jones to kick the ball forwards. Farr-Jones executed a grubber kick. Campese and All Blacks inside centre John Schuster were engaged in a sprint towards the ball. As Schuster tried to dive on the ball, Campese was able to kick the ball forwards and fall upon it to score a try in the 15th minute of the game, which was converted to level the scores at 6-6.

1989 Australia rugby union tour
In late 1989, during the 1989 Australia rugby union tour, Australia played a two-Test series against France. The two-Test series marked what would be the start of five consecutive Tests that Australia would play against France from 1989 to 1990.

The 1989 Australia rugby union tour was the first major overseas tour that new Wallabies' centre Tim Horan would undertake with Campese. Campese announced plans to travel to Nice while the Wallabies were based in Toulose. Horan is alleged to have responded, "What's everybody going down to see Campo's niece for?"

Australia 32 – France 15 (Strasbourg – 4 November 1989)
In the first Test in Strasbourg, France suffered what was then its biggest defeat on its soil with a score of 32 to 15. It was also Australia's then highest score against France and their biggest ever winning margin against France.

Following a halftime score of 10–12, Australia scored three of its four tries in the second half. In the 62nd minute of the Test, Campese stopped a French backline movement with a tackle on Stéphane Weller, that forced his opposite winger to "knock the ball on". The game continued with an Australian attacking scrum, from which Nick Farr-Jones executed a box-kick that wasn't properly fielded by French winger Stéphane Weller. Campese toed the ball forward and followed it. He kicked the ball forward again and was able to fall on it score Australia's third try in the 63rd minute of the game. Campese was involved in Australia's fourth and final try of the Test during the final play of the game. He occupied French centre Philippe Sella with a goosestep, before delivering the final pass to Tim Horan who scored his second try in the Test.

Former Australian rugby union captain Nick Farr-Jones later described Australia's 1989 Test in Strasbourg as his favourite moment as an international rugby union player. Five Australian players made their Test debut: Jason Little, Brendon Nasser, Peter FitzSimons, Rod McCall, and Darren Junee (who played as a substitute). Australian hooker Phil Kearns, prop Tony Daly, and centre Tim Horan played their second Tests for Australia in that Test. The Test also marked the first time Austranian centre combination Tim Horan and Jason Little played in tandem with one another for Australia.

Australia 19 – France 25 (Lille – 11 November 1989)
France won the second Test played in Lille 25 to 19. Campese played his 48th Test in this match.

1990: Australia vs France
In 1990 Campese was dropped from an Australian Test side for the first time since his debut for the Wallabies in New Zealand on the 1982 tour. Campese was omitted because he did not return early enough from Italy and therefore Australian selectors could not assess his form in a club match.

2nd Test: Australia 48 – France 31 (Brisbane – 24 June 1990)
Campese returned for the second Test against France, won 48–31, in what Australian Rugby Union president Joe French described as the best Test match of rugby he had ever seen. The match was later described by Wallaby flanker Simon Poidevin (who did not play in the match) as "a breathtaking 48-31 victory" which "will go down in history as one of the finest ever played". Australia's points tally of 48 was a then record for the Wallabies against an International Rugby Board member country. The try count of six, which included a penalty try, was also the highest number of tries scored against a fellow IRB country."

Campese was involved in Australia's second try of the game, which came from a refereeing mistake. In the eighth minute of the Test, Nick Farr-Jones made a break near the half-way line. As he was chased down by Franck Mesnel, he hoisted a forward pass to Campese, running from fullback. Campese set himself to kick a high ball that tested French winger Lacombe. Australian prop Ewen McKenzie pressured Lacombe, the ball came loose and was 'soccered' forward by debutant centre Paul Cornish into the French in-goal, where he fell onto the ball to score a try.

David Campese was involved in a controversial refereeing decision that led to France's second try. Australia had an attacking scrum inside France's 22. Michael Lynagh threw a loose pass that hit the ground. After Wallaby winger Ian Williams recovered the ball, he lofted an inside pass that was intercepted by France flyhalf Didier Camberabero who sprinted down the field. As Nick Farr-Jones chased Camberabero down in cover-defence, Camberabero offloaded a pass to French winger Lacombe. While Lacombe approached the Australian try-line, Campese was able to tackle him and successfully dislodge the ball before it was touched down. Referee Clive Norling was unsighted and awarded the try.

Perhaps the most well-documented moment of the Test came when French fullback Serge Blanco beat a Campese tackle to score a try. Simon Poidevin recalls that, "...the one memory which stands out is the amazing try scored by Serge Blanco. Taking the ball on his own line, the French captain sliced between Carozza and Little on the quarter line before swerving past Campese at halfway. Then Blanco beat Williams, Carozza and Campese in the run to the line to score one of the greatest individual tries of all time."

In Campo: Still Entertaining Campese selected Blanco at fullback in his greatest international XV of all-time team, writing that, "In 1990 we played France in a three-Test series at home before a tour of New Zealand, and Serge scored one of the greatest international tries during the second game in Brisbane. He carried the ball about 80m for the score and never once looked like he was getting out of second gear. Because of that languid running style, Blanco was deceptively quick, as we found out that afternoon..."

However, Campese would score the final try of the Test by running past Blanco. Australia had a scrum inside France's 22 in front of the goal-posts. Campese stood on the left-hand attacking side of the scrum. As Farr-Jones took the ball from the back of the scrum and started to run to the right, Campese followed Nick Farr-Jones. Nick Farr-Jones shaped to pass the ball to Australian eightman Tim Gavin, which held-up Blanco and French eightman Olivier Roumat. Nick Farr-Jones passed to Campese, who ran through a gap and past Blanco before evading Roumat coming across in cover defence, to score a try untouched.

In Noddy: The Authorised Biography of Michael Lynagh, Slack documented Clive Norling's reaction to Campese's final try. "As Lynagh lined up for goal, there was Norling nattering away in the background," Slack documented. "'Great swerve by Campese. Good advantage played there, boyo.'"

3rd Test: Australia 19 – France 28 (Sydney – 30 June 1990)

Campese returned to the fullback role for the third Test against France - a game that marked his 50th Test for Australia. He became the second person, after Simon Poidevin, to reach this milestone. Australia lost the Test to France 19–28. Campese scored his 36th Test try from a second-phase play. Michael Lynagh looped Tim Horan, passed the ball to Jason Little who made a line-break and passed the ball to an unmarked Campese in open space who scored the try.

1990: Australia 67 – U.S.A. 9 (Brisbane – 8 July)
Prior to Australia's 1990 three-Test tour to New Zealand, Australia played a one-off Test against the US, in which Campese played. The Test contains the only instance in Campese's career where he successfully completed a drop-goal. Campese also scored a try.

1990 Bledisloe Cup Test Series

Australia 6 - New Zealand 21 (Christchurch – 21 July 1990)
Campese played his 52nd Test for Australia in Australia's first Test against New Zealand in 1990, becoming the most capped Australian rugby player in history, surpassing Simon Poidevin's record of 51 Tests. Poidevin had made himself unavailable to play for Australia on Australia's 1990 tour to New Zealand.

Playing on the left wing, Campese opposed All Blacks right-wing John Kirwan. Kirwan scored a try by running onto a cut-out pass sprinting at full pace, and out-running Campese to score a try in the corner.

Australia 17 - New Zealand 27 (Auckland – 4 August 1990)
Campese was selected at fullback for the second Test against New Zealand, replacing Greg Martin who was dropped following the first Test. All Blacks hooker Sean Fitzpatrick scored a try early in the Test, after All Blacks winger John Kirwan ran down the blindside, fended off Nick Farr-Jones, and was able to pass the ball inside to Fitzpatrick while being tackled by Campese. Campese responded later in the Test by passing the ball to Willie Ofahengaue for a try while being tackled by opposing All Blacks fullback Kieran Crowley. Ofahengaue powered over a Kirwan attempted tackle.

Following Flett's missed opportunity, the All Blacks went downfield. John Kirwan ran down the blindside, and fended Campese off at fullback, before slipping a pass to New Zealand halfback Graeme Bachop, who slipped under a Campese tackle-attempt to score the final try of the Test.

Australia 21 – New Zealand 9 (Wellington – 18 August 1990)
Australia defeated New Zealand in the third Bledisloe Cup Test of 1990, ending New Zealand's undefeated streak of 50 games including 23 Tests.

1991

Australia 63 – Wales 6 (Brisbane – 21 July 1991)
Prior to Australia's first international Test of 1991 against Wales, Campese played for the New South Wales Waratahs in a 71–8 victory over the touring Welsh team, in which he scored five tries.

Campese then played in Australia's first Test of the 1991 season against Wales, which was won by Australia 63–6. Campese scored one try in the Test. He would later write that it was "...a Test that resembled a training run for the Wallabies."

Australia 40 – England 15 (Sydney – 27 July 1991)
Campese played for the Wallabies in a single Test against England during the 1991 England rugby union tour of Australia and Fiji. England toured Australia as reigning Five Nations champions, having also won the grand slam of rugby union that year.

Campese scored two tries against England and received praise for his defence on his opposite England winger Chris Oti.

Campese scored his first try in the 29th minute of the Test when Australian captain and scrum-half Nick Farr-Jones executed a "box kick" that exposed England's outside backs following a "22 drop-out." Campese out-sprinted his opposite winger Chris Oti, received a favourable bounce to regather the ball, and scored the try near the corner flag.

Campese scored his second try in the 44th minute of the match after some interplay between Australia's backrow and backs from the back of a scrum. From the back of a scrum, Nick Farr-Jones passed the ball to Tim Horan, while Australia's eightman Tim Gavin and Farr-Jones both looped Horan. Gavin received a pass from Horan and passed the ball to Farr-Jones, who occupied Campese's opposing winger, and passed the ball to an unmarked Campese, who scored the try.

1991 Bledisloe Cup Test Series

Australia 21 – New Zealand 12 (Sydney - 10 August 1991)
Australia defeated New Zealand in the first Bledisloe Cup Test of 1991, 21 points to 12. It was Campese's 57th Test for the Wallabies.

Australia 3 – New Zealand 6 (Auckland - 24 August 1991)
Australia lost the second Test of the 1991 Bledisloe Cup series to New Zealand 6–3 in a tryless match.

Scottish referee Ken McCarthy came under scrutiny following the Test for his performance. Wallaby flanker Simon Poidevin, in For Love Not Money, criticised McCarthy "for effectively destroying the Test as a spectacle." Poidevin recorded that, "There were no fewer than 33 penalties and too few (none, in fact, that come to mind) advantages played."

1991 Rugby World Cup
David Campese was named Player of the Tournament for the 1991 Rugby World Cup. He was the tournament's equal leading try scorer along with Jean-Baptiste Lafond with six. French rugby newspaper Midi-Olimpique named Campese number one in its World Rugby Top 10. Moreover, Campese was voted the 1991 Australian Society of Rugby Writers Player of the Year, winning the award by a record margin by scoring 64 points, 39 points more than John Eales in second place with 25. Jack Pollard wrote that "it was the genius of David Campese that made Australia world champions." Australia's captain for the 1991 World Cup, Nick Farr-Jones, stated that without Campese, Australia might not have won the World Cup.

1991 World Cup Pool Match – Australia 32 – 19 Argentina (Llanelli – 4 October 1991)
Australia started the 1991 Rugby World Cup with a pool match against , in which Campese scored two tries and created a third.

1991 World Cup Pool Match – Australia 9 – Western Samoa 3 (Pontypool – 9 October 1991)
Campese played in Australia's second World Cup Pool Match against Western Samoa on the right wing, in which he became the first person to play 60 Test matches for Australia. Australia defeated Western Samoa by scoring three penalty goals (kicked by Michael Lynagh) to one penalty goal kicked by Western Samoa.

1991 World Cup Pool Match – Australia 38 – Wales 3 (Cardiff – 12 October 1991)

1991 World Cup Quarter Final – Australia 19 – Ireland 18 (Dublin – 20 October 1991)
Campese scored the first try of the Test in the first half of the World Cup Quarter Final off a backline move

Campese scored his second try off a move entitled "cut-two-loop", a move Australia also called in the final moments of the quarter-final to score a Test-winning try.

With five minutes left in the Test, a defensive lapse from Campese led to an Irish try which gave them an 18–15 lead.

In the final minutes of the Test, Australia trailing 15–18, Australia kicked off long. Irish scrum-half Rob Saunders "sliced his kick badly", about "fifteen metres" "inside their twenety-two." Australia won the ensuing line-out.

Australia "got the put-in to the scrum on the left-hand side of the field" Lynagh called "cut-two-loop" one more time.

Lynagh scored the Test-winning try, and Australia won 19–18.

1991 World Cup Semi Final – Australia 16 – 6 New Zealand (Dublin – 27 October 1991)
Campese's performance in the 1991 Rugby World Cup semi-final has been described by former Australian coach Bob Dwyer as Campese's signature Test in his career. In an ABC documentary entitled The Rise and Rise of Australian Rugby Dwyer stated that, "I must say that throughout the 1991 World Cup, and this semi-final match in particular, Campo was a standout performer. We all know what a great player he was over such a long period of time, but I'm sure that his first-half performance that day has never been beaten."

Prior to the start of the Test, Campese did not stand in-front of the haka, instead opting to practice his kicking downfield.

Australia defeated New Zealand 16–6 in the 1991 Rugby World Cup semi-final, in which Campese was a decisive factor. Rugby writer Philip Derriman records that, "David Campese made two stunning interventions in the play which produced the only tries of the match and thus were responsible for Australia's 16-6 win."

Rugby writer Peter Jenkins records that, "Campese scored the first Wallaby try in the 12th minute [Note: It was the 6th minute], drifting off the blind wing into the five-eighth position to take the first pass from the ruck. He then angled across field to turn his archrival, John Kirwan, inside out before touching down. In the 35th minute he gathered a chip-kick from Lynagh, avoided one defender and drew two others before lobbing a basketball pass, without looking, over his right shoulder for centre Horan to score."

Greg Growden in the Sydney Morning Herald documented Campese's performance by writing that, "Campese scored possibly the most exhilarating solo try of the tournament, and inspired another team try which was possibly even better, to prove he is the best attacking player in the world, and definitely the best competitor of this World Cup. Campese is the Pelé of world Rugby."

In Running Rugby Mark Ella wrote of Campese's pass to Tim Horan that, "Campese's over-the-shoulder pass to Tim Horan in the World Cup semifinal against New Zealand in 1991 must be ranked as close to the ultimate of its type. I cannot think of another player in the world who could have managed it." A description of Campese's try is further illustrated in the same book: "Campese's famous over-the-shoulder pass to Tim Horan in the 1991 World Cup semi-final. Having beaten the New Zealand fullback, Campese succeeds in committing his opposite number, John Timu, by running straight at him, then steps in-field and draws the other two defenders. Having thus brilliantly succeeded in committing the only three All Blacks in a position to defend, Campese flicks a pass over his shoulder to Tim Horan, who now has the space to run around Timu.""

Following the Test All Blacks co-coach Alex Wyllie remarked, "There's always Campo, and when you've got a player like that in your team you always know probably something is going to happen. He did it again – he just pulled that one out. An individual like that: one day he could probably blow it, but the other four days he could make it. It was just unfortunate he made it against us." In the documentary John Kirwan: Running on Instinct, New Zealand's other co-coach John Hart praised Campese. "David Campese was the star of the first half and he played brilliant rugby," he said. "And, you know, it needs something special in the game like this to break, and he broke it on two occasions." John Kirwan reflected in the same documentary that: "Campo! Campo was awesome, you know. He 'cut us to bits' early."

Following the Test The Independent quoted former Ireland fly-half Tony Ward saying of Campese that, "He is the Maradona, the Pelé of international Rugby all rolled into one. You cannot put a value on his importance to our game. He is a breath of fresh air and I think perhaps the greatest player of all time. Without being too soppy, it was an honour to be at Lansdowne Road just to see him perform."

Clem Thomas of The Observer wrote following the Test that, "it will always be remembered as Campese's match..." In 2013 former New Zealand rugby player Sean Fitzpatrick wrote that, "One man can never win a match on his own but he came as close to that as is possible with his display in the 1991 World Cup semi-final. We were beaten by half-time." British rugby writer Stephen Jones added, "If I had to put together the greatest rugby match I've ever seen I'd have the first half of Australia versus New Zealand in '91 in Dublin…"

1991 World Cup Final – Australia 12 – 6 England (London – 2 November 1991)
Following England's 1991 Rugby World Cup semi-final victory over Scotland in a tryless Test, Campese led a media campaign designating England as a boring rugby team. Campese said that if he played for England, he would insist on playing the flyhalf position because it would be the only way he could touch the ball. Campese is quoted as saying, 'I wouldn't play for England even if you paid me' and 'Playing that sort of boring stuff is a good way to destroy the image of the game. They're all so scared of losing over here they won't try anything.' He further added that 'England would never beat us in the World Cup because they are a bunch of Toffs, and we are convicts.'

Australia won the 1991 World Cup Final by beating England 12–6. Campese did not have much "ball possession" in the final, as evidenced by the fact that Wallabies flyhalf Michael Lynagh touched the ball 17 times in the Test, compared to England flyhalf Rob Andrew, who touched the ball 41 times. However, four moments involving David Campese are often recorded in reports of the final.

Campese came close to scoring a try in the early stages of the first half of the final.

Australia scored their only try of the 1991 Rugby World Cup Final in the 26th minute. Campese's "chasing" played an indirect part in the lead-up to the Wallabies' first try. Australia scored moments later off a rolling maul.

Campese was involved in the biggest controversy of the World Cup Final in the 69th minute. English flanker Peter Winterbottom attempted a pass to Campese's opposing winger Rory Underwood, who at that stage "may have had an overlap," when Campese knocked the ball forward. The referee ruled it a deliberate knock-on and awarded England a penalty." The English hooker, Brian Moore, thought the referee should have awarded a penalty try.

In the final stages of the final, Campese was involved in a backline movement that nearly led to an English try.

1992

Australia v Scotland (1992)
Scotland toured Australia in 1992 for a two-Test series.

Australia 37 – Scotland 13 (Brisbane – 21 June August 1992)
The Wallabies won the second Test against Scotland 37–13.

Campese left the field due to injury, to be replaced by Peter Jorgensen.

Australia 26 – South Africa 3 (Cape Town – 22 August 1992)
On 15 August 1992 South Africa played a rugby Test against New Zealand (lost 24-27), which was their first Test at international level since the International Rugby Board (IRB) banned South Africa from playing international Test-level rugby due to apartheid boycotts. One week later on 22 August 1992 South Africa played the World Champion Wallabies.

In the Test against South Africa, Campese became the first Australian to play 70 Test matches and he became the first rugby player to score 50 tries.

Campese's sudden appearance from nowhere to take the try-scoring pass from Tim Horan, and the cleanliness of his jersey in the muddy conditions, have been the subject of various portrayals in rugby literature. Michael Blucher in Perfect Union: The parallel lives of Wallaby centres Tim Horan and Jason Little described Campese as 'standing out like a beacon in the only remaining unmuddied gold jersey.' Peter FitzSimons in Nick Farr-Jones: The Authorised Biography depicted Campese as 'the man with the cleanest jersey on the field, shining out there like a flashing orange beacon, David Campese on the burst, who crossed for the try.'

Blucher further recorded that: "A magical moment shared by the same two who had created similar havoc for the All Blacks in Dublin. 'You still owe me a few,' Campese said, after Horan had picked himself up and rushed over to offer congratulations."

1992 Australia Rugby Union Tour of Europe
In October/November 1992, Campese travelled with the 10th Wallabies for the 1992 Australia rugby union tour of Europe. He was frequently rested due to ongoing injury concerns and missed most of Australia's provincial games. However, he played in both Tests on tour, against Ireland and Wales, and the traditional tour-closing game against the Barbarians. He was also the Wallabies' top try-scorer on tour with four (despite only playing six games on tour).

Australia endured an injury-plagued tour. Wallaby captain Michael Lynagh suffered a badly dislocated shoulder in Australia's victory over Ireland, loosehead props Tony Daly and Cameron Lillicrap and centre Anthony Herbert were required to fly back to Australia due to injuries, and Australian second-rower John Eales suffered a shoulder injury that sidelined him for a year in the game against Llanelli. In addition, Australia's two wingers David Campese and Paul Carozza were both forced to sit out of training sessions "nursing niggling injury concerns." Australia came under scrutiny following losses in provincial games to Munster, Swansea, and Llanelli - matches in which Campese did not play.

Australian team management selected a full-strength side, including Campese, for Australia's first touring match against Leinster (won 35-11). Leinster scored the first try in the early stages of the match, after Campese failed to properly tackle his opposite winger Niall Woods, allowing Woods to score a try. However, after the Wallabies trailed 6–8 at half-time, Campese scored two tries in the second half - one off a Tim Horan scissors' pass and the second off a Michael Lynagh inside-pass from a set-play. Campese did not play in Australia's second match on tour, a famous 19–22 loss to Munster. Campese returned to the Test side for their third match on tour against Ulster (won 35-11). In the Wallaby's final match prior to their first Test on tour against Wales, Campese came off the bench in the second half of Australia's 14–6 victory over Connacht.

Following Australia's Test victory over Ireland, Campese was rested and not named in Australia's next five provincial matches prior to the following Test against Wales - against Swansea (lost 6-21), Wales B (won 24-11), Neath (won 16-9), Llanelli (lost 9-13), and Monmouthshire (won 19-9).

Following Australia's victory over Wales in their second and final Test of the tour, Campese did not play in the Wallabies' only provincial game before their final match on tour against the Barbarians, against Welsh Students (won 37-6).

Australia 23- Wales 6 (Cardiff - 21 November 1992)
Campese played in his final Test of 1992 in a 23–6 victory over Wales. Campese scored a try after gathering a kick-through by Australian outside-centre Jason Little and sprinting down the sideline for a try.

1993

Australia 52 - Tonga 14 (Brisbane - 4 July 1993)
Campese commenced his 1993 Test season with the Wallabies, scoring two tries in their 52–14 victory over Tonga.

1993: Australia vs South Africa

Australia 12 - South Africa 19 (Sydney - 31 July 1993)
Early in the first Test against South Africa, Campese was involved in a scuffle with Springboks Pieter Muller and James Small.

Australia led South Africa 9-0 after 16 minutes following three penalty goals kicked by Marty Roebuck. However, in the final 10 minutes of the first half, Springbok inside centre Heinrich Füls executed a kick, forcing Campese to run back and field it, while he and Springbok outside centre Pieter Muller gave chase. Campese was unable to field the ball, and instead slipped over the ball about a metre from the Australian try-line, allowing Muller to gather the ball and score the try.

In the documentary of Campese's career, Campese: Rugby's My Life, Campese confessed that he perhaps "tried too hard" in this Test, trying to compensate for his early mistake.

Following Campese's first Test performance, Alec Evans, the assistant coach of Australia's 1984 Grand Slam side, went public suggesting that Campese should be dropped from the Australian side.

Australia 28 - South Africa 20 (Brisbane - 14 August 1993)
Campese recovered from his first Test performance to help Tim Horan score a try in the second Test. Australia had a scrum in their own territory and Campese was in position for a clearing kick. Campese instead opted to run and dummied past South African openside flanker Francois Pienaar. Campese's run brought play into South African territory. Campese then flicked a pass along the ground, described by Australian rugby commentator David Fordham as an 'ill-disciplined pass', that Australian eightman Tim Gavin recovered. Two phases later Campese took a pass from Nick Farr-Jones in the first-receiver position, launched a high kick that his opposite winger Jacques Olivier wasn't able to field. The ball took a fortuitous bounce, and Australian inside centre Tim Horan was able to chase the ball down and fall upon it to score a try.

Australia 19 - South Africa 12 (Sydney - 21 August 1993)
In My Game Your Game David Campese is reported calling the third Test against South Africa from 1993 one of the greatest performances of his rugby career. "When I think back over my Test career, it seems most of my best performances have been outside Australia, such as the World Cup of 1991 in Britain, the Wallaby Tour of the UK in 1988, and the Grand Slam trip of 1984," he said. "There have been some good moments at home, such as the third Test against South Africa at the Sydney Football Stadium in 1993".

Following the first two Tests of the series, Campese noticed that following short kick-offs, when mauls would be formed, his opposite South African winger would stand further than 20 metres behind the contest for the ball. Prior to the Test, Campese arranged with Wallaby halfback Nick Farr-Jones that if he saw his opposite winger standing far in the backfield, he would call "Leaguey" to signal to Farr-Jones to attempt a blindside move with him. During the 19th minute of the second half of the third Test Australia formed a rolling maul in their own half. Nick Farr-Jones (playing his last Test for Australia) linked with Campese for the last time in their representative careers. He went down the blind-side and passed the ball to Campese, who ran past Springbok scrumhalf Robert du Preez. Campese ran along the sideline and brought play into South African territory. He then gave an inside pass to Farr-Jones in support, who in turn passed the ball inside to Tim Gavin in support. Gavin ran the ball into contact. The ball came back to Farr-Jones from the ruck, he handed it on to Phil Kearns, who gained metres for Australia with a strong run. As the next stage of play developed, Campese had re-positioned himself in the centres where he took a pass, made a tiny break, and lofted a pass over several South African players to Tim Horan in support, who went on to score a try in the 59th minute of the Test.

Campese received the man of the match award for his performance. Following this game, Spiro Zavos in The Sydney Morning Herald called Campese "the Mozart of Rugby."

1993 Australia rugby union tour
In 1993 Campese toured with the Wallabies for their 1993 Australia rugby union tour, which included a Test against Canada and two Tests against France.

Australia 43 - Canada 16 (Calgary - 9 October 1993)
Campese scored three tries in Australia's first Test of their 1993 Australia rugby union tour against Canada.

1994: Australia vs Italy
Campese was a member of the Wallabies for a two-Test series against Italy during the 1994 Italy rugby union tour of Australia.

Australia 23 - Italy 20
Campese was capped for the 84th time of his international career in the first Test against Italy, which the Wallabies narrowly won 23–20. Rugby journalist Greg Growden documented that 'Australia were no world champions last night.'

Australia 20 - Italy 7 (Melbourne - 25 June)
Australia won the series 2-0 after defeating Italy 20–7 in the second Test, during which Campese scored a controversial try.

Jack Pollard in Australian Rugby: The Game and its Players documented that: "David Campese got his 59th Test try because of a lucky decision with South African referee Ian Rogers clearly erred in ruling that Campese grounded the ball before he was pushed over the sideline. Campese again played a lot as a second fullback, thrilling Melbourne fans with the length of many of his linekicks. Australia won 20-7 in heavy rain."

1994: Australia vs Western Samoa
Campese continued to play for the Wallabies during the 1994 Western Samoa rugby union tour of Australia. Western Samoa had defeated Five Nations champions Wales earlier in 1994, and won their four provincial games leading into the game, including victories against the Queensland Reds (24-22) and the New South Wales Waratahs (21-18).

Australia 73 - Western Samoa 3
Campese regards his performance in Australia's 1994 Test against Western Samoa one of his four best performances for the Wallabies (along with the 1984 and 1988 Barbarian matches and the 1991 Rugby World Cup semi-final against New Zealand). Australia defeated Western Samoa 73–3, in which Campese scored a try. Campese scored the first try of the Test when, while about to be tackled into touch, he executed a chip kick, followed it through, and scooped the ball off the ground for one of his greatest tries. Peter Jenkins in Wallaby Gold would later report that, "Campese on the wing was dynamic..."

1995: Australia vs Argentina
Prior to the 1995 Rugby World Cup Australia played a two-Test series against Argentina which was won 2–0.

Australia 53 v Argentina 7 (Sydney - 6 May 1995)
Rugby writer Peter Jenkins in Wallaby Gold: The History of Australian Test Rugby documented that, "The Pumas' tackling was also committed, if sometimes questionable, but they struggled to contain the pace and slickness of a Wallaby backline led by Lynagh, whose deputies included centre Jason Little and winger David Campese."

Australia 30 v Argentina 13 (Sydney - 6 May 1995)
Campese scored two tries in the Wallabies' second Test against the Pumas in 1995. Following this Test Campese would go scoreless for his next six Tests, until a Test against Canada 14 months later.

1995 Rugby World Cup
Campese played in three Tests at the 1995 Rugby World Cup. England defeated Australia in the quarter-finals. Campese would later state in Campo: Still Entertaining that, "I know David Campese had an ordinary tournament."

Australia 18 – South Africa 27 (Cape Town – 25 May 1995)
Campese played in Australia's first pool match against South Africa in Cape Town. In Campo: Still Entertaining Campese reflected that, "I was not anywhere near my best and missed a crucial tackle on my opposite winger Pieter Hendriks, allowing him to score. We had been ahead 13-9 at the time, with Lynagh scoring the opening try of the tournament in the 32rd minute of the match. Five minutes later the Springboks had snatched the lead from us when Hendriks beat me on the outside, raised his fist in triumph, and scored in the left corner. We never led again."

Campese further wrote that, "In the World Cup match against South Africa, I kicked the ball three or four times when I could have run. Maybe I was worried my speed was going, and that was affecting my confidence, especially to counterattack."

Australia 22 – England 25 (Cape Town – 11 June 1995)
English revenge for the final defeat came in the next World Cup when they beat the Wallabies in a nail-biting quarter-final. After the match, Campo somehow found himself on the same bus as all the English and endured some ribbing.

1995 Bledisloe Cup
Following the 1995 Rugby World Cup, Campese was dropped from the Australian team for their first Bledisloe Cup Test match against New Zealand in Auckland. Following an injury to Australian fullback Matt Burke in the first Bledisloe Cup Test of 1995 in Auckland, the Australian selectors picked Rod Kafer to take Burke's place in the Australian team. Kafer then suffered a broken leg during a training session. Campese was then recalled to a training session with the Wallabies, with the information that if Burke proved his fitness, he would not play in the second Bledisloe Cup Test. Burke recovered from his injury to play in the second Bledisloe Cup Test. However, another injury to Australian centre Daniel Herbert led to Campese's selection on the bench in the second Bledisloe Cup Test of 1995. In Campo: Still Entertaining Campese wrote that "for some reason, I was meant to play that weekend against the All Blacks."

2nd Bledisloe Cup Test: Australia 23 – New Zealand 34 (Sydney – 29 July 1995)
The second Bledisloe Cup Test of 1995 marked the first and only time in Campese's rugby career where he started a Test on the bench. Australian winger Damien Smith suffered an injury in the first half of the second Bledisloe Cup Test of 1995, allowing Campese to play his 92nd Test for Australia, coming off the bench as a substitute in the second half.

This Test marked the only time Campese directly opposed All Black winger Jonah Lomu in a Test (Ben Tune marked Lomu in the 1996 Tri Nations tournament, whereas Campese marked Jeff Wilson).

In Campo: Still Entertaining Campese reflects that, "As chance would have it, Jonah got the ball in the opening stages of the second half and ran straight at me… I think I shut my eyes, but I tackled him. Later in the half he pushed me aside to score a try, but I could at least claim to have cut him down once." Following the Test Campese and Lomu met in the changing rooms and exchanged their jerseys. Lomu gave Campese his number 11 jersey while Campese gave Lomu his number 16 jersey. Campese's 92nd Test marked the last Test he would play in the amateur era.

1996
In 1996 Bob Dwyer was replaced as coach of the Australian rugby union team by Greg Smith. Campese later wrote that, "It gave me some early hope of forcing my way back. I don't know for sure that Bob had written me off as a Test player. But judging by those closing months of the 1995 season, it would not have been too promising for me, I suspect, had he held on to the Wallaby post."

Regarding his decision to continue playing Test level rugby Campese writes that, "In the end, my decision to play on was taken with one overriding goal in mind. I wanted to end my Test career on a high note. Not with an appearance off the bench in a Bledisloe Cup loss to the All Blacks." He further adds that, "the prospect of playing 100 Tests had enormous appeal too… But, to be perfectly honest, the initial aim was just to get back in the starting side." Campese was selected for the Australian team for the first eight Tests of their 1996 season, before being dropped following his 100th Test against Italy. He would play one more Test for Australia against Wales in the Wallabies final Test of the year.

1996: Australia vs Wales

Australia 56 - Wales 25 (Brisbane - 8 June 1996)
Campese played his first professional Test match for Australia in the first Test against Wales in 1996.

1996: Australia 74 - Canada 9 (Brisbane - 29 June)
Campese scored his 64th and final international Test try in Australia's 74–9 defeat of Canada. It was Campese's first Test try in 14 months.

1996 Australian Tour to Europe
Campese was a member of the 11th Wallabies to tour the United Kingdom. The 1996 Australia rugby union tour in Europe was Campese's final rugby tour before his retirement from international Test rugby. While the tour contained Tests against Italy, Scotland, Ireland and Wales, Campese only played against Italy and Wales. The Australian team was heavily criticised for its performances. However, the tour remains the only time Australia had won every match on a tour to Europe that included provincial matches.

Australia 40 – Italy 18 (23 October 1996)
Australia's first Test of the 1996 Tour to Europe against Italy marked David Campese's 100th international Test. He became the second person, after French centre Philippe Sella, to achieve the milestone. The Test took place two days after Campese's 34th birthday in Padova, where Campese had played rugby in Italy for three years from 1984 to 1986. The Test took place close to his father's birthplace, Vicenza. In Campo: Still Entertaining Campese recalls that, "Unfortunately, they were not treated to vintage performances, by myself or the rest of the Wallabies. The Italians got stuck into us and, in some respects, we were lucky to get away with a 40-18 scoreline."

Australia's Tim Horan was moved to the wing for the Test against Italy and scored a try. Campese then missed national selection for the next Test against Scotland, with coach Greg Smith opting to continue to play Tim Horan on the wing and play Joe Roff in Campese's place. This marked only the third time in Campese's 101-Test career that he was dropped from the Australian rugby team.

Campese also did not achieve national selection for the Test against Ireland. Australian coach Greg Smith opted to return Tim Horan to the inside centre position and play Jason Little on the wing in Campese's place.

In a midweek match against Munster, Campese played what he later described as "one of my better performances for quite some time, scoring two tries, setting up another and perhaps defending like I'd never defended before." Following this performance, Campese was selected for Australia's final Test of the 1996 Australia rugby union tour.

Australia 28 – Wales 19 (Cardiff – 1 December 1996)
Campese was recalled to the Australian side for their final Test of the 1996 European tour, his 101st Test and his final Test appearance playing for the Wallabies. Australian coach Greg Smith returned Jason Little to the outside centre position and situated Campese on the right wing while Joe Roff occupied the left wing. Australia led Wales 18–6 at halftime. In the second half Welsh outside centre Gareth Thomas scored a try after intercepting a pass from George Gregan. Following this Welsh flyhalf Jonathan Davies kicked two penalties to give Wales a 19–18 lead. Australia's Matt Burke landed a penalty to give Australia a 21–19 lead, before Australia scored a penalty try in the final moments of the Test to win 28–19.

Australia 39 – Barbarians 12 (Twickenham – 7 December 1996)

Campese played his last match for Australia against the Barbarians at Twickenham. Prior to the match Campese was offered the special privilege of playing for the Barbarians in his final match. However, Australian team management rejected the idea. Campese scored a try in his last game after taking a pass from Australian hooker Michael Foley and slipping under an attempted tackle from South African flyhalf Joel Stransky. Following the game, Campese completed a lap of honour and was afforded a standing ovation from crowd, to bring an end to his international career.

Rugby Sevens
Campese is one of the most decorated rugby sevens players in history. Former Australian rugby player and sevens coach Michael O'Connor offered Campese the following praise after placing him in his 'Best Ever Aussie Sevens team': "Campo in his prime – there wasn't a better finishing winger that I've seen. He just knew how to get over that try line. But also his support lines were a class above. The lines he ran, he put himself in such good support positions. That and his reading of the game was very rare. He also played a lot of sevens for Australia and for Randwick at the Melrose Sevens, so he had that in depth level of understanding of the game."

Hong Kong Sevens

Throughout his rugby sevens career, Campese made 12 appearances at the Hong Kong Sevens (1983-1990, 1993–94, 97-98), during which he played in three victorious Australian campaigns ('83, '85 & '88), and won the Leslie Williams Award for Player of the Tournament in 1988. On 16 March 2015, the Hong Kong Rugby Football Union (HKRFU) announced Australia's David Campese as the fifth member of 'The Hong Kong Magnificent Seven', the HKRFU's commemorative campaign to recognise the seven most formative players to have played in the past 40 Years of Sevens in Hong Kong in 2015. Campese was honoured alongside of Jonah Lomu, Waisale Serevi, Eric Rush, Christian Cullen, Ben Gollings and Zhang Zhiqiang.

In 1983 Campese debuted for the Australian Sevens team at the Hong Kong Sevens, in a team containing Peter Faulk (manager), John Maxwell (captain-coach), Mark Ella, Glen Ella, Brendan Moon, Peter Lucas, Gary Pearce, Chris Roche and Qele Ratu. The tournament took place in what has been described as "some of the wettest conditions ever recorded in Hong Kong in March." Australia began by defeating Malaysia (44-0), Japan (42-0) and the Solomon Island (26-0). Australia then defeated Tonga 12–6 in the quarter-final, Western Samoa 16–0 in the semi-finals, and Fiji 14–4 in the final. Australia scored 192 points and conceded only 18 in its seven matches at the 1983 Hong Kong Sevens.

In 1984, Campese returned to his second Hong Kong Sevens tournament with the Australian Sevens team, in a team containing captain-coach John Maxwell, Mark Ella, Glen Ella, Brendan Moon, Chris Roche and Michael Lynagh. Australia won their first match of the tournament against Kwang-Hwa, and faced Canada in the second game. Australia were eliminated by Canada from the Hong Kong Sevens in controversial circumstances.

Both sides had scored the same number of tries and goals and Australia was eliminated on the toss of a coin. Since then the rules have been changed to allow for extra time when teams finish level, and the first team to score eliminates the other side.

In 1985 Campese won his second Hong Kong Sevens tournament – Australia's third tournament victory overall – in a 24–10 victory over Public School Wanderers. The Australia rugby sevens team contained: Roger Gould (QLD, captain/coach), David Campese (ACT), Phillip Cox (NSW), Glen Ella (NSW), Bruce Frame (NSW), Peter Lucas (NSW), Michael Lynagh (QLD), Simon Poidevin (NSW), Steve Tuynman (NSW). Alan Jones (Manager). Australia defeated Sri Lanka, Tonga and Ireland Wolfhounds on day one, before beating Western Samoa in the semi-final. The starting Australia national rugby sevens team for the final against Public School Wanderers consisted of: 1. Roger Gould; 2. Simon Poidevin; 3. Peter Lucas; 5. Michael Lynagh; 6. Bruce Frame; 7. David Campese; 9. Glen Ella. The Public School Wanderers from Scotland included: 1. Eric Paxton; 2. Gary Callander; 4. Bob Hogarth; 5. John Rutherford; 6. Peter Steven; 7. John Jeffery; 7. Roger Baird.

Public School Wanderers opened the scoring in the final, when Callendar took an inside pass from Hogarth for a try that was converted. However, Australia responded when Glen Ella doubled-around Simon Poidevin and ran through a gap. Ella then flicked a scissors pass to Peter Lucas who out-sprinted Roger Baird to Public School Wanderers' try-line. In the final play before half-time, Michael Lynagh took a "tap-kick" near Australia's try-line. He passed to Glen Ella who in turn moved the ball back to Lynagh. Lynagh threw the ball to Simon Poidevin who ran down the sideline. Campese supported Poidevin on the outside, took a pass from him, and ran more than half the length of the field to score his seventh try of the tournament, to equal Peter Steven as the tournament's leading try-scorer. Lynagh converted Campese's try to give Australia a 12-6 half-time lead.

In the second half, Public School Wanderers' Peter Steven made a line-break but threw the ball backwards to Glen Ella who intercepted the ball for Australia. Ella handed the ball to Campese, running at pace, who ran around John Jeffery to score a try behind the posts - his eighth try of the tournament, making him the leading try-scorer at the 1985 Hong Kong Sevens. Michael Lynagh converted the try to give Australia a 18–6 lead. Lynagh scored Australia's final try, which started with Glen Ella hurling a pass in-field to Simon Poidevin who caught a low-landing ball. Poidevin likewise threw a low pass to Roger Gould. Poidevin doubled-around Gould, who feigned a pass-attempt before moving the ball inside to Bruce Frame. Frame kicked the ball forward and Michael Lynagh caught it on the full before running more than half the length of the field to score a try under the posts, which he converted to give Australia a 24–6 lead. John Jeffery scored the last try of the final in the concluding play of the game, picking up the ball and placing it over the Australian try-line after Peter Steven was tackled less than a metre from it. The try was unconverted and Australia won the final 24–10.

In late 1985, Campese was embroiled in controversy when he, Glen Ella and Roger Gould decided to participate in a sevens tournament in South Africa. At the time, international sports people were asked to support opposition to South Africa's apartheid regime by boycotting tour there. Campese's move drew criticism from Australian Prime Minister Bob Hawke.

In 1986, Australia made it to the semi-finals of the Hong Kong Sevens, but were defeated by the French Barbarians 20–14, who went on to lose the final to New Zealand 32–12. In May 1986, Campese played for the Australian sevens team at the Sport Aid Sevens tournament at Cardiff. Australia easily defeated Ireland before going on to lose to England after Glen Ella threw a pass that went over Campese's head and was intercepted by England for a try.

In 1987, Campese captained the Australian side for the first time at the Hong Kong Sevens with Alan Jones as coach. Australia faced Fiji in the semi-final, in which they fell behind 0-14 after five minutes, before going on to lose the game 8-14. Following the Hong Kong Sevens, Campese participated in the NSW Sevens at Concord Oval. Australia defeated Western Samoa, Korea and the Netherlands on the first day, before beating Tonga in the quarter-final and Korea in the semi-final. Australia then defeated New Zealand in the final 22–12, in what Simon Poidevin later described as "one of the most satisfying and gutsy [victories] that I’ve been associated with in an Australian team."

In 1988, Campese embarked on perhaps his most successful campaign at the Hong Kong Sevens, winning his third and final Hong Kong Sevens tournament with the Australian side, and being awarded the Leslie Williams Award for Player of the Tournament. The victorious Australian squad contained: Michael Lynagh (QLD, captain), Brad Burke (NSW), David Campese (NSW), Julian Gardner (QLD), Tim Gavin (NSW), Jeff Miller (QLD), Acura Niuqila (NSW), Brian Smith (QLD), Steve Tuynman (NSW). Bob Dwyer (manager/coach).

In 1989 Australia made it to the final of the Hong Kong Sevens, but were defeated in the final by New Zealand, 10–22.

Campese made his ninth appearance at the Hong Kong Sevens in 1993 with the Australian team. Australia were defeated by Fiji in the semi-final 14–17. Tim Horan scored a try in the first minute of the game, but Campese was forced to leave the match shortly after this due to injury. Waisale Serevi scored three tries for Fiji and they emerged victorious.

In 1994, Campese captained Australia for the Hong Kong Sevens, with Glen Ella acting as Australian coach. The team contained Tim Horan, Jason Little, David Wilson, Ilie Tabua, George Gregan and Ryan Constable. Australia easily won their round-robin stages on the first day, narrowly defeated Samoa in the quarter final, comprehensively defeated Fiji in the semi-final, before losing the final to New Zealand 32–20.

Campese returned to Hong Kong three years later for the 1997 Rugby World Cup Sevens. Australia were one of three teams, along with England and tournament hosts Hong Kong to automatically qualify for the event. Australia were defeated by New Zealand in the quarter-final 12–40.

Melrose Sevens

During 1990 Campese participated in the Melrose Sevens in Scotland playing for Randwick, after the Melrose Rugby Club accorded Campese's Randwick Rugby Club the singular honour of an invitation to its one hundredth Melrose Sevens. Twenty clubs took part, and Randwick were one of four guest teams including Racing Club of Paris, Harlequins and London Scottish from outside of Scotland. Randwick's squad of ten players were: Gavin Boneham, David Campese, Michael Cheika, Anthony Dwyer, Mark Ella, John Flett, John Maxwell (Captain / Coach), Acura Niuqila, Darren Phillips and Lloyd Walker. John Howard was the manager and Stuart Wheeler, the assistant manager.

Campese was Randwick's top points scorer with 44 of its 92 points. The Herald of Scotland reported that Campese scored seven tries and nine conversions, which included scoring all of Randwick's points against Melrose. He was later praised for giving "one of the most dominant performances in tournament history." Randwick won their first match against Glasgow High Kelvinside 30–0 and defeated Edinburgh Academical Football Club 20–6 in their second match.

Randwick then defeated Melrose in the semi-final 16–15. Campese opened the scoring of the semi-final with a try that he converted to give Randwick a 6–0 lead. The scores were level at halftime 6-6. Campese scored first for Randwick in the second half with a try that he again converted to make the score 12–6. However, Melrose leveled the scores again, and with two minutes remaining Melrose captain Craig Chalmers kicked a penalty goal for a 15–12 lead. The Sydney Morning Herald wrote that, "Randwick looked briefly flustered but Campese, skipping through on a 30m run, rescued the game with 60 seconds remaining, to send the Australians through 16-15." Graham Law in The Scotsman reported on the final moments of the semi-final and wrote that, "Randwick secured ball from the kick-off and when Melrose infringed at a ruck full-time had been reached but, correctly, referee Jim Fleming allowed play to continue and Walker released Campese from nearly halfway. Chalmers, with the first engagement, and Purves both made tackles but Campese, now domiciled in Italy, seemed to expand and aquaplaned to the goal-line. It was no-side and Keith Robertson's men were out. The Sunday Herald of Scotland wrote that, "No-one else in the tournament would have had the pace and verve to squeeze in at the right corner to deny the hosts..." Following the tournament Campese admitted that, ""If it had not been wet, I would not have made that try against Melrose."

Campese's Randwick side defeated Kelso in the final 28–6 in front of 20,000 spectators. Campese scored a try and converted two John Flett tries in the final. The Sydney Morning Herald wrote that, "Campese, throughout the day benefiting from his telepathic understanding with Mark Ella, scored an outstanding, individual try from his own 22, Ella converting for a 12-4 lead." The Sunday Herald of Scotland wrote that, "Most of all, however, the Australians had the threatening presence of David Campese. Whether lying wide or rallying in retreat, Campese was the spearhead. An inch of space to run was gleefully accepted, and over the tournament, he scored 46 points, with seven tries and nine conversions, including all of Randwick's points against Melrose."

Rugby World Cup Sevens

Campese competed at the inaugural 1993 Rugby World Cup Sevens tournament for the Australia national rugby sevens team. The Australian squad contained: 1. Ronnie Kirkpatrick (Res); 2. Matthew Burke (NSW); 3. Willie Ofahengaue (NSW); 4. Semi Taupeaafe; 5. Jim Fenwicke; 6. Grant Lodge (NSW); 7. John Flett; 8. Ryan Constable (QLD); 9. David Campese (NSW); 10. Michael Lynagh (QLD). Australia was placed in Pool C. They defeated Taiwan in their opening match 28–8, before losing to Tonga 7–10 in their second game, in a surprise upset. Isi Tu'ivai opened the scoring for Tonga when he took a quick tap-kick, booted the ball in-goal, and ran around Campese for the touchdown. Australian Semi Taupeaafe scored a try in the second half to level the scores 7-7. However, Tonga's Tu'ivai kicked the match-winning drop goal in the final play of the game to give his side a 10–7 victory over the Australians. Australia responded to their second game loss with a 40–0 victory over Italy in their third game. Australia defeated Argentina 42–5 in their fourth group stage game, and concluded their first day matches with a 26–14 victory over Scotland. Australia finished second in Group C behind Tonga on the same number of points. Tonga lost their first group game to Scotland 7-15. However, because they defeated Australia in their game against one another, they finished top of their group.

The quarter-finals of the inaugural 1993 Rugby World Cup Sevens took the form of a round-robin tournament with the teams split into two groups. Campese's Australia qualified for Group F which also consisted of South Africa, New Zealand and England. Australia defeated South Africa 7–5 in their opening match of the group. Campese was instrumental in Australia's only try of the game. Australian player Jim Fenwicke was driven back in a tackle and he lofted the ball to Campese in support. South African fullback André Joubert rushed up and attempted to intercept the floating ball which opened a gap for Campese, who ran from his own quarter and into the South African half. Chester Williams attempted to ankle-tap Campese but missed. Campese attempted to run around Joost van der Westhuizen and occupied him with a goose-step before he passed in-field to John Flett. Flett made a diagonal run toward the posts, but was tackled just before he could score, before he found Matt Burke in support who scored next to the posts. Michael Lynagh converted the try to give Australia a 7–0 lead. However, South Africa responded when André Joubert scored an unconverted try. The score remained 7-5 and Australia emerged victorious. The Australians then lost their next group game against New Zealand 42–0. Australia needed to defeat England in their final group stage to progress to the semi-finals of the tournament. Campese scored in the first minute of the game when he fielded a kick from Nick Beal. Campese beat Beal on the inside and then made a run along the side-line where he avoided an attempted ankle-tap from Matt Dawson, outflanked Tim Rodber and scored the try untouched. Ryan Constable added another try to give Australia a 14–0 lead. In the final play before halftime, England's Justyn Cassell scored a try from some loose line-out ball, which Nick Beal failed to convert, giving Australia a 14-5 halftime lead. Dave Scully scored a try for England after picking up a loose ball from "broken-play" to reduce Australia's lead to 14–12. However, Campese responded by occupying the England number 7 (possibly Damian Hopley) with a goose-step, which created an overlap for Semi Taupeaafe who scored the final try of the game untouched. Australia won the last quarter-final pool game against England 21–12.

Australia topped its group with seven points, the same number as England (South Africa and New Zealand finished third and fourth in their group respectively with five points). Controversy arose following the quarter-final round robin stage. England finished with the same number of table points as Australia, scored more tries than them in the group stage (seven tries to four), and believed they had done enough to avoid Fiji in the semi-finals. However, tournament organisers informed England that because they finished with the same number of points as Australia, the team that won the individual game between the two sides would top Group F. This meant that Australia faced Ireland in one semi-final and England met Fiji in the other. Australia defeated Ireland in the semi-final 21-19 after Willie Ofahengaue scored the game-winning try in the last play of the game.

Australia narrowly lost the first Rugby Sevens World Cup to England in the final 17–21. England player Andy Harriman scored in the first minute of the game when he received the ball in open space and ran around Campese to score under the posts. England raced to a 21–0 lead after tries from Lawrence Dallaglio and Tim Rodber. Australia responded with tries (unconverted) scored by Michael Lynagh and David Campese. Campese scored his try by goose-stepping past Tim Rodber and chipping the ball over Dave Scully into the in-goal area and falling onto the ball. Semi Taupeaafe scored the final try (converted) for Australia, but they went on to lose the final 17–21.

In 1997, Campese's rugby season involved Sevens representation and a trip to the World Cup in Hong Kong.

Paris Sevens and 1998 Commonwealth Games

In 1998 Mark Ella replaced Jeff Miller as coach of the Australian Sevens Team. After New South Wales Waratahs coach Matt Williams explained to Campese that he wanted to use him as an 'impact' player coming off the bench more often during the 1998 Super 12 season, the ARU approached Campese about acting as an ambassador for the rugby union code trying to raise to game's profile throughout Australia. The ARU also wanted Campese to take a more active role in Rugby Sevens, participating in the IRB World Series Sevens circuit leading up to the 1998 Commonwealth Games to be held in Malaysia. Campese played in Australia's Sevens team alongside players Brendan Williams, Ricky Nalatu, Matt Dowling, Tyron Mandrusiak, Richard Graham, and Cameron Pither. In Ella: The Definitive Biography Mark Ella recalled that, 'Campo was past his best, but in terms of rugby sense and experience he was still miles ahead of the young players.'

The Australian team toured Uruguay, Argentina, France, Hong Kong, Fiji and Jerusalem. In Fiji in the Australian Sevens team were easily defeated in the quarter-finals by Fiji. In Tokyo Australia lost to New Zealand in the semi-finals.

The Australian Sevens team then toured Paris and won their first Sevens tournament in 10 years by defeating New Zealand in the final.

Prior to the 1998 Commonwealth Games the Australian Sevens team visited Israel for the "Holy Sevens", dubbed "The Holiest Sevens Tournament in the World". Mark Ella later recalled that the Australian team visited Bethlehem "to see where Campo was born."

At the 1998 Commonwealth Games Australia finished on top of their pool, defeated England in the quarter-finals, but were defeated by Fiji in the semi-finals. New Zealand defeated Fiji in the final to win gold, Fiji received silver, and Australia defeated Samoa in the third-place match to win a bronze medal. Prior to Australia's third-place play-off, Campese asked Australian coach Mark Ella to select the younger players ahead of him. Campese ran onto the field in the final minutes to convert a Brendan Williams try, thus completing his last game of rugby sevens for Australia.

Rugby League Offers

– Bob Dwyer, 'Campese', The Winning Way (1992), 71.

Shortly following Campese's international rugby debut on the 1982 Australian tour to New Zealand, several rugby league clubs made offers to him to switch rugby codes. The Canberra Raiders, Manly-Warringah, Canterbury Bulldogs, and the Gold Coast (when they first joined the league), are all reputed to have made offers to Campese to join their club.

In 1983 the Parramatta Eels contacted Campese about playing rugby league for their club. Parramatta won the premiership the last two consecutive years, and won it again in 1983. The side contained players such as Peter Sterling, Brett Kenny, Mick Cronin, Eric Grothe and Steve Ella. The club's chief executive Denis Fitzgerald contacted Campese and made him an offer, however he rejected the team's proposal.

In The Winning Way, former Australian coach Bob Dwyer documented that retired Parramatta Eels coach Jack Gibson once expressed a desire to have Campese in his team: "Jack Gibson, the celebrated League coach in Sydney, said to me one day that he would love to have Campese in his team for three reasons. One, he was a brilliant attacker. Two, he was a good chaser of the ball. Three, he has a high work rate. The last of these is quite true, incidentally, although Campese rarely receives acknowledgement for it."

During the Wallabies' 1988 Australia rugby union tour of England, Scotland and Italy, Campese was contacted by St Helens prior to Australia's 12th match on tour against Combined Services about playing for their club. St Helens reportedly asked Michael O'Connor to recommend a player to join the club, and he nominated Campese. St Helens are reported to have offered Campese a deal between £300,000 and £350,000 (then estimated to be between $660,000 AUD and $770,000 AUD) over a three-year period, dependent upon a few variables such as number of appearances. Campese rejected the deal within a few minutes.

Following the Wallabies' final match of the U.K. leg of their tour, Campese travelled to Italy where St Helens made more overtures towards him, which were declined. St Helens continued to contact Campese about playing rugby league when he returned to Australia, however he continued to reject their offers.  On 15 July 1989, the night of the third Test between the Wallabies and the British Lions, St Helens made another offer to Campese.  When he declined their proposal, St Helens offered him another £10,000 ($21,000 AUD), but for the last time he rejected their request to play of their club. "I suppose I was shocked that the interest from St Helens was still there after my performance that day," Campese wrote in On a Wing and a Prayer. "But perhaps they figured I would be an easy target after a game like that!"

In Campo: Still Entertaining, Campese wrote that, "Looking back now, as a long retired Wallaby, it does not bother me in the slightest that I didn't accept an offer to play rugby league."

Legacy and Honours
David Campese has been cited by several rugby pundits as one of the greatest rugby union players of all time.

In 1989 David Campese was selected in the Rothmans Rugby Union Yearbook "Team of the Decade" at left-wing. The team was chosen by a panel consisting of former rugby players Gareth Edwards, Jean-Pierre Rives, Ian Robertson, and David Kirk. The Team of the Decade contained: Full-back: Serge Blanco (France); Right-wing: John Kirwan (New Zealand); Outside-centre: Danie Gerber (South Africa); Inside-centre: Philippe Sella (France); Left-wing: David Campese (Australia); Flyhalf: Hugo Porta (Argentina); Scrum-half: Dave Loveridge (New Zealand); Number eight: Morne du Plessis (South Africa); Flanker: Graham Mourie (c) (New Zealand); Flanker: Michael Jones (New Zealand); Lock: Andy Haden (New Zealand); Lock: Steve Cutler (Australia); Tight-head prop: Graham Price (Wales); Hooker: Colin Deans (Scotland); Loose-head prop: Robert Paparemborde (France). The panel agreed that one selection was straightforward, that of David Campese on the left-wing.

In 2001, rugby commentator Bill McLaren was asked by The Times to select his greatest rugby union team of all-time. Bill McLaren's all-time World XV contained: Full-back: Andy Irvine (Scotland); Right-wing: Gerald Davies (Wales); Outside-centre: Danie Gerber (South Africa); Inside-centre: Mike Gibson (Ireland); Left-wing: David Campese (Australia); Flyhalf: Rob Andrew (England); Scrum-half: Gareth Edwards (Wales); Number eight: Mervyn Davies (Wales); Openside Flanker: Fergus Slattery (Ireland); Blindside Flanker: Zinzan Brooke (New Zealand); Lock: Frik du Preez (South Africa); Lock: Colin Meads (All Blacks); Tight-head prop: Graham Price (Wales); Hooker: Sean Fitzpatrick (All Blacks); Loose-head prop: Fran Cotton (France). McLaren nominated David Campese his all-time favourite player, rugby union's greatest entertainer, and the greatest rugby union player of all-time.

Campese was inducted into the Sport Australia Hall of Fame in 1997. In 1999 Australia Post celebrated the centenary of Australian federation emitting 250 collectible stamps depicting the champ and autographed by the same Campese. He Received an Australian Sports Medal in 2000, a Centenary Medal in 2001, and was made a Member of the Order of Australia in 2002. In 2007 Campese was honoured in the third set of inductees into the Australian Rugby Union Hall of Fame. He was also inducted into the IRB Hall of Fame in 2013. In 2013 Australian sports magazine Inside Rugby named its four Australian Invincibles – a rugby union equivalent of rugby league's Immortals. David Campese was named alongside Col Windon, Ken Catchpole, and Mark Ella as the first Invincibles of Australian rugby union.

Notes

References

Printed

Online
 100 Greatest All Blacks - 1st XV: No 8 John Kirwan New Zealand Herald, 7 July 2020.
 1989 Tour - How the wounded Lions came back from the dead The Courier Mail, July 7, 2020
 'A Nation That Forgets It's Past Has No Future' - Winston Churchill David Campese, LinkedIn, 7 July 2020.
 Australian Honours Search Facility Australian Government: Department of the Prime Minister and Cabinet, 7 July 2020
 Australia’s David Campese Goosesteps His Way into ‘The Hong Kong Magnificent Seven’ Hong Kong Sevens, 7 July 2020.
 Bill McLaren's World XV Rugby Special, BBC Sport, 5 March 2002
 Campese completes walk of shame BBC Sport, 15 December 2003
 Ella, Campese, Catchpole, Windon, Invincibles ESPN, July 7, 2020.
 Footy legends get stamp of approval with special issue The Courier Mail, 7 July 2020.
 Four stars from the Green movement Peter FitzSimons, The Sydney Morning Herald, 13 June 2013.
 From Frank's Vault: Australia vs France - 1987 World Cup semi-final Frank O'Keeffe, The Roar, 1 December 2017
 From Frank's Vault: Australia vs England (1991) Frank O'Keeffe, The Roar, 6 January 2018
 Hong Kong's Magnificent Seven Hong Kong Sevens, 7 July 2020.
 Leslie Williams Award Rugby7.com, 7 July 2020.
 Jeremy Guscott's Rugby World Cup Dream XV The Rugby Paper, July 7, 2020
 Mark Ella, David Campese, Ken Catchpole and Colin Windon named as inaugural Wallabies Invincibles Fox Sports Australia, June 13, 2013.
 Mark Ella, Ken Catchpole, David Campese and Col Windon named rugby union invincibles The Courier Mail, 13 June 2013.
 Nation's former rugby greats gain 'Invincible' status The Northern Star, 13 June 2013.
 The Sydney Morning Herald from Sydney, New South Wales, Australia · Page 56 The Sydney Morning Herald, 7 July 2020.
 The Sydney Morning Herald from Sydney, New South Wales, Australia · Page 55 The Sydney Morning Herald, 7 July 2020.
 Will Carling: My Top 50 Rugby Players The Telegraph, 7 July 2020
 Wallabies quartet voted invincible The Australian, 13 June 2013.
 You're a Legend... David Campese Ivan Smith, 7 July 2020.

Other
 John Kirwan: Running on Instinct - Video Documentary of John Kirwan's rugby union career.
 Rugby's my Life — Video Documentary of David Campese's rugby union career.
 The Rise and Rise of Australian Rugby - Australian Broadcasting Corporation documentary.

External links
 
 

1962 births
Living people
Australian rugby union players
Australia international rugby union players
Barbarian F.C. players
Rugby union fullbacks
Rugby union wings
World Rugby Hall of Fame inductees
Members of the Order of Australia
Recipients of the Australian Sports Medal
Recipients of the Centenary Medal
Sport Australia Hall of Fame inductees
Australian people of Italian descent
Sportspeople of Italian descent
Commonwealth Games bronze medallists for Australia
Rugby sevens players at the 1998 Commonwealth Games
Australia international rugby sevens players
Male rugby sevens players
Commonwealth Games medallists in rugby sevens
Commonwealth Games rugby sevens players of Australia
Rugby union players from New South Wales
People from Queanbeyan
Medallists at the 1998 Commonwealth Games